John Young (1888 – 25 September 1915) was a Scottish professional football inside right who played in the Scottish League for Morton, Celtic, Ayr and Dundee Hibernian.

Personal life 
Young worked as a foundry labourer and was married with one child. During the early months of the First World War, he enlisted as a private in the Queen's Own Cameron Highlanders and arrived on the Western Front, in trenches at Locon, France, on 30 June 1915. Young was killed on 25 September 1915, during a frontal attack on Little Willie Trench, north of the Hohenzollern Redoubt, during the Battle of Loos. He is commemorated on the Loos Memorial.

See also
List of people who disappeared

Career statistics

References 

1888 births
1915 deaths
Association football inside forwards
Ayr F.C. players
British Army personnel of World War I
British military personnel killed in World War I
Celtic F.C. players
Dundee United F.C. players
Footballers from Glasgow
Greenock Morton F.C. players
Missing in action of World War I
Missing person cases in France
Queen's Own Cameron Highlanders soldiers
Scottish footballers
Scottish Football League players
Scottish Junior Football Association players
Strathclyde F.C. players